George Carey, 2nd Baron Hunsdon KG (1547 – 9 September 1603) was the eldest son of Henry Carey, 1st Baron Hunsdon and Anne Morgan. His father was first cousin to Elizabeth I of England. In 1560, at the age of 13, George matriculated at Trinity College, Cambridge.

Military and political career
In December 1566 he accompanied the Earl of Bedford on an official mission to Scotland, to attend the baptism of the future King James. Mary, Queen of Scots gave him a ring and a chain with her miniature portrait.

During the Northern Rebellion of 1569, George was knighted in the field by Thomas Radcliffe 3rd Earl of Sussex for bravery. George had challenged Lord Fleming, the commander of Dunbar Castle, to single combat.

George served as a member of Parliament in the Commons for several terms (for Hertfordshire in 1571, for Hampshire in 1584, 1586, 1589, and 1593).
He was created Knight Marshal in 1578. He was given the tenure of the lands of the Cornish recusant Francis Tregian when the latter was convicted of praemunire in 1577 for aiding and abetting the missionary priest Cuthbert Mayne.

George was sent to Carisbrooke Castle on the Isle of Wight and later assumed command of the Isle's defenses during the Spanish Armada threat.

In July 1596, when his father died, George became the second Baron Hunsdon, and the following year he was appointed Lord Chamberlain of the Royal Household, a position which had been held by his father.

Theatre
Both Henry and George Carey were patrons of the professional theatre company in London known as "the Lord Chamberlain's Men". Talents such as William Shakespeare and Richard Burbage were among the writers and performers of the company.  In 1597 George was invested as a Knight of the Garter, and it is sometimes proposed that the first performance of William Shakespeare's Merry Wives of Windsor was held to commemorate the occasion.

Family
George married Elizabeth Spencer (related to poet/author Edmund Spenser), who like her husband was a patron of the arts. They had one daughter, Elizabeth.

Death
He died on 9 September 1603 (from venereal disease and mercury poisoning), and his brother John (the next eldest) became the third Lord Hunsdon.

References

 

1547 births
1603 deaths
Alumni of Trinity College, Cambridge
Georger
Knights of the Garter
Lord-Lieutenants of Hampshire
Carey, George
Carey, George
16th-century English nobility
17th-century English nobility
Carey, George
Carey, George
Carey, George
Carey, George
Carey, George
Barons Hunsdon